Kimsa Q'awa (Aymara kimsa three, q'awa little river, ditch, crevice, fissure, gap in the earth, "three streams (or crevices)", also spelled Quimsa Khaua) is a  mountain in the Bolivian Andes. It is located in the La Paz Department, Inquisivi Province, Colquiri Municipality, southeast of Colquiri.

References 

Mountains of La Paz Department (Bolivia)